WGXA (channel 24) is a television station in Macon, Georgia, United States, affiliated with Fox and ABC. Owned by Sinclair Broadcast Group, the station maintains studios on Martin Luther King Jr. Boulevard (GA 11/GA 22/GA 49/US 80/US 129) in downtown Macon, and its transmitter is located on GA 87/US 23/US 129 ALT (Golden Isles Highway), along the Twiggs–Bibb county line.

Established in 1982, WGXA was the third television station in Macon but emerged immediately as a more credible competitor than the longer-established WCWB-TV (channel 41) to locally dominant station WMAZ-TV (channel 13). Originally an affiliate of ABC, it was sold in 1995 to GOCOM Media and changed affiliations from ABC to Fox, with which it felt it could increase its local programming presence. An ABC subchannel was added in 2010 after the existing ABC affiliate balked at the network's programming. Local newscasts for the Fox and ABC subchannels, as well as a local newscast for air in Albany, Georgia, are produced from WGXA's Macon newsroom.

History

As a primary ABC affiliate
Aside from the brief existence of WETV/WNEX-TV/WOKA-TV from 1953 to 1955, Macon had one commercial television service (WMAZ-TV, channel 13) from 1955 to 1968, when WCWB-TV (channel 41) signed on. WMAZ had been a secondary affiliate of ABC since signing on in 1953, but by the 1970s, Macon was among the largest markets remaining without full three-network service; only cable viewers or those lucky enough to receive stations from Atlanta or Columbus could see the full ABC schedule. An effort in 1970 to get WMCN-TV off the ground on channel 24 failed, and it was not until later in the decade that movement started in earnest to bring Middle Georgia its third commercial TV station. A trio of WMAZ-TV employees—Lloyd Harris, Stan Carey, and Bill Manly—formed Broadcasting Dynamics and began planning a third station, which prompted WMAZ to fire them in September 1977.

A year later, Russell-Rowe Communications of Atlanta filed with the Federal Communications Commission (FCC) for a construction permit to build channel 24. Just days later, Raymond Rowe died, but Herman J. Russell pressed on, joined by the Broadcasting Dynamics team, which had decided they did not have the money to pursue their own application. Lewis Television of Savannah, Georgia, owned by Julius Curtis Lewis Jr., also filed for channel 24, but it dropped its application in October 1979, clearing the way for Russell-Rowe to be awarded the permit in January 1980.

While Russell-Rowe hoped to name the station WROW in honor of the deceased Rowe, the first call letters on the construction permit were WWLG. The station purchased the former site of the Brown Hotel in downtown Macon, while a tower went up on the Cochran Short Route, near the other TV transmission facilities for the Macon area. While WGXA made its on-air debut on April 21, 1982, it was nowhere near fully ready. The studio was unlit; equipment was still in boxes, while other components had not yet arrived. Local commercials had to be edited in Atlanta or Columbus. The first local newscast did not air until October 18, six months later.

In Macon's television ratings, WGXA established itself as the second station, far behind the commanding audience shares that WMAZ held for news and entertainment programming but slightly ahead of WMGT (the renamed WCWB-TV).

GOCOM ownership and switch to Fox

In February 1995, Russell-Rowe—whose three owners, Russell and two other men, were all past retirement age—filed to sell the station to GOCOM Media of Charlotte, North Carolina, for $11.75 million. GOCOM closed on the sale in July; it replaced the management and announced an infusion of $1 million in cash and the hiring of 20 new staff for the station.

That September, GOCOM announced the station would switch network affiliations from ABC to Fox, a move that the company felt would allow the station to more effectively counterprogram WMAZ with a 10 p.m. local newscast and shows aimed at a younger audience. This displaced Register Communications-owned WPGA-TV (channel 58), which began airing Fox programming in December 1994; during the 1994 season, WGXA had aired the NFL on Fox. WPGA-TV aligned with ABC, setting up an affiliation switch for January 1, 1996. WGXA became one of just nine Fox affiliates ranked number one or two in their markets. GOCOM was itself acquired by a group led by Bain Capital in 1997. Two years later, GOCOM merged its ten-station portfolio with Atlanta-based Grapevine Communications; the company then changed its name to Piedmont Communications.

Frontier ownership and return of ABC
In 2007, Frontier Television Investors, a company owned by Jason R. Wolff, purchased WGXA-TV from Piedmont for $18.7 million, equivalent to $ in 2021 dollars.

Under Frontier ownership, ABC returned from WPGA-TV after 13 years to a subchannel of WGXA beginning January 1, 2010. The move was precipitated by two factors, both involving WPGA-TV's owner, Lowell Register: he disapproved of a change by ABC regarding the institution of affiliation fees, and he also decried what he felt was an increasingly risqué program offering from ABC, telling a reporter for The Macon Telegraph, "I had somebody tell me they're running a good bit of gay and lesbian stuff on it". The new subchannel was branded as "ABC 16", reflecting the physical channel then used for WGXA's broadcasts.

The shift of ABC programming from WPGA-TV to the new WGXA-ABC subchannel led to a dispute between Cox Communications, the primary cable provider in Macon, and WPGA-TV over whether WPGA's channel 6 position belonged to WPGA-TV—as that station contended—or could be used for ABC programming—as Cox desired, in order to place the new WGXA subchannel on cable channel 6, and believed it could do under the terms of its contract with Register. WPGA-TV won a temporary restraining order in late December to hold the position, leading to the ABC subchannel debuting on cable channel 15.

A district court dismissed the case, but Register appealed; on June 23, 2011, the Georgia Court of Appeals upheld the ruling enabling Cox to drop WPGA from its lineup and place WGXA-ABC on cable channel 6, which it did in July. (A final appeal by Register to the FCC ended when the commission found that WPGA's contract with Cox rendered it a station that elected retransmission consent.)

Sale to Sinclair
On March 24, 2014, Frontier Radio Management reached a deal to sell WGXA to Sinclair Broadcast Group for $33 million; the sale was completed on September 3, 2014.

News operation
WGXA began producing local newscasts on October 18, 1982. The launch of News 24 brought the market back to two full-service television newsrooms; WCWB had, the month before, dropped its full-length newscasts to produce inserts into CNN Headline News. Nearly immediately, the station made a more credible showing than WCWB, attracting about half the audience of the dominant WMAZ.

In conjunction with the switch to Fox, the station expanded its local news programming with new weekend newscasts and invested in improved equipment as Gocom sought to make the station more competitive against WMAZ. A morning newscast, News A.M., debuted in August 1997. Viewership grew among youth audiences for the newscasts. The station retained its early evening newscast at 5:30 p.m. until 2001, when it consolidated it with the 10 p.m. newscast as an hourlong program.

On March 1, 2010, an expansion of the WGXA newsroom began with a new 5:30 p.m. broadcast for the Fox subchannel and dedicated 7 and 11 p.m. newscasts on the ABC subchannel; the combined brand "NewsCentral" was adopted. From 2010 to 2012, the station aired a morning radio-television simulcast with WMAC (940 AM), featuring the same people that had been producing a similar show for WPGA radio and television.

In 2019, WGXA morning news anchor Rick Devens competed on the CBS reality show Survivor: Edge of Extinction.

WGXA handles production of a weeknight hour-long 10 p.m. newscast for sister station WFXL in Albany. Local reporters in the Albany area cover that region's news, which is presented from Macon. The WGXA news director also holds that title for WFXL, and in 2022, WGXA was added to the portfolio of the general manager of WFXL and WACH-TV in Columbia, South Carolina.

Technical information

Subchannels
The station's digital signal is multiplexed:

WGXA's broadcasts became digital-only, effective June 12, 2009.

The station was repacked from channel 16 to 26 in 2019.

References

External links

Fox network affiliates
ABC network affiliates
Comet (TV network) affiliates
GXA
Television channels and stations established in 1982
1982 establishments in Georgia (U.S. state)
Sinclair Broadcast Group